Italy competed at the 1987 Summer Universiade in Zagreb, Yugoslavia and won 30 medals.

Medals

Details

References

External links
 Universiade (World University Games)
 WORLD STUDENT GAMES (UNIVERSIADE - MEN)
 WORLD STUDENT GAMES (UNIVERSIADE - WOMEN)

1987
1987 in Italian sport
Italy